George Marcus may refer to:
George E. Marcus, American anthropologist
George M. Marcus (born 1941), Greek-American real estate broker
George Marcus, early pseudonym used by Wilt Chamberlain (1936–1999)

See also
Wilt Chamberlain (Born 1936), George Marcus being a fake name he used when playing for the NBL.